Timuçin is the Turkish spelling of the Mongol masculine given name Temüjin, which is the birth name of Genghis Khan. Notable people with the name include:
Timuçin Esen (born 1973), Turkish actor
Timuçin Şahin (born 1973), Turkish jazz guitarist
Timuçin Fabian Kwong Wah Aluo (born 1987), English DJ professionally known as Jax Jones